Motherhood is a 2009 American comedy-drama film written and directed by Katherine Dieckmann and starring Uma Thurman.

Plot

In New York's West Village, a mother's dilemmas of marriage, work, and self are shown in the trials and tribulations of one pivotal day.

Cast
 Uma Thurman as Eliza Welsh, the married mother of two
 Minnie Driver as Sheila, her best friend
 Anthony Edwards as Avery, her husband
 Clea Lewis as Lily
 Jake M. Smith as Snotty Production Assistant 
 Betsy Aidem as Jordan's Mom
 Dale Soules as Hester
 Jodie Foster as herself

Production
Motherhood and Arlen Faber (later renamed The Answer Man) were a pair of films independently financed and produced by the New York City-based iDeal Partners Film Fund.

The two films were part of a coordinated effort by iDeal Partners to reduce the risk in investing in film production during the late-2000s recession; they were pre-sold to foreign distributors, cast with "commercially-tested actors" and took advantage of U.S. state tax incentives that encouraged film production.  Both also premiered at the 2009 Sundance Film Festival. As of January 2009, Jana Edelbaum, co-founder of iDeal Partners, was predicting "at least a 15 percent return for her investors and – if something big happens with Motherhood or Arlen Faber – as much as 40 percent."

Inspiration

The writer/director's "real life was the inspiration for the film"; Dieckmann's home consists of two rent-stabilized apartments on the same floor of a West Village building, with one apartment for the bedrooms, and the other containing a kitchen, office and living room. In the film; Thurman's character "lives in [literally the] same building, in a bisected apartment."  Filming took place in New York City starting in May 2008 and lasting about 25 days.

Release
Motherhood received a limited release in the United States on October 23, 2009, by Freestyle Releasing.

In March 2010, the film's British premiere was confined to a single London cinema: the Apollo Piccadilly Circus. The box office gross was £9 on its opening night and £88 on its opening weekend; eleven viewers purchased a ticket, with only one person attending its first showing. Veteran film critic Barry Norman said, "It's a reasonable assumption that there was a marketing and advertising catastrophe, and people didn't know it was showing."

Reception
The film received generally negative reviews. On review aggregator Rotten Tomatoes, the film holds an approval rating of 20% based on 51 reviews, with an average rating of 3.88/10. The website's critics consensus reads: "Despite Uma Thurman's comic skills, Motherhoods contrived set-ups and clichéd jokes keep this comedy from delivering laughs – or insights into modern parenting." In October 2009, Roger Ebert gave the film two stars out of four, saying the film is "billed as a comedy, but at no point will you require oxygen. There are some smiles and chuckles and a couple of actual laughs, but the overall effect is underwhelming"; Thurman is "doing her best with a role that may offer her less than any other in her career, even though she's constantly onscreen." A. O. Scott said Thurman's character is "scattered, ambivalent, flaky and inconsistent – all of which is fine, and energetically conveyed by Ms. Thurman. But what are tolerable quirks in a person can be deadly to a narrative, and Ms. Dieckmann, trying for observational nuance, descends into trivia and wishful thinking. ... The humor is soft, the dramas are small, and the movie stumbles from loose and scruffy naturalism to sitcom tidiness."

The Times observed that while Motherhood was only the second-worst flop in British cinematic history, the film that beat it to that honor, 2007's My Nikifor, which "took £7 on its launch ... was a small independent effort rather than a £3m Hollywood production [like Motherhood]."

Thurman won two awards at the Boston Film Festival, one for Best Actress for her work in Motherhood and an out-of-competition Film Excellence Award for her career accomplishments.

References

External links
  (UK)
 
 
 
 
 

2009 films
2009 comedy-drama films
2009 independent films
American comedy-drama films
American independent films
Films about parenting
Films produced by Christine Vachon
Films set in New York City
Films shot in New York City
Killer Films films
2000s English-language films
Films directed by Katherine Dieckmann
2000s American films